Beshir Ismayil oglu Imanov or Beshir Imanov (was an Azerbaijani colonel.

Early life and education 
Imanov was born in the village of Horadiz, Fuzuli Rayon in 1914.

In 1931, he graduated from the Technical School of Pedagogical Education of Fuzuli, and upon assignment started his activity as a teacher at a secondary school in the village of Horadiz.
 
Having graduated from the Railway Technical School in Baku in 1943, Imanov worked as a foreman in Hajili station. Thereupon, to continue with his education he entered the Railways Institute in Tbilisi, and was assigned the deputy chief of the Alat-Nakhchivan railway line after graduation from the institute.

Career
In 1948, he was appointed the chief of Alat Department of People's Commissariat for Internal Affairs. From 1953 he took various positions having been transferred to Azerbaijan Railway Administration. From 1960 to the end of his life Imanov held the position of the police chief of Azerbaijan Railways.

Upon the decree by the Presidium of the Supreme Soviet of the USSR, on 27 December 1967 Imanov was awarded the “hammer and sickle” medal and given the title of Hero of Socialist Labour for his socialist obligations and heroism in labour.
 
He met with Heydar Aliyev at the Kremlin in 1967, where Aliyev congratulated Imanov on his appointment to the rank of colonel.

Police colonel Imanov died of a heart attack and was buried in Baku in 1969.

References
 

1914 births
1969 deaths
Heroes of Socialist Labour
People from Fuzuli District